Sir Philip Anstruther-Paterson, 3rd Baronet (born Anstruther; 13 January 1752 – 5 January 1808) was a Scottish politician.

He served as Member of Parliament for Anstruther Burghs from 1774 to 1777. In 1778 he married Anne Paterson, daughter of Sir John Paterson, 3rd Baronet and Anne Hume-Campbell, Baroness Polwarth, but they had no children. In 1782 he changed his name to Anstruther-Paterson. He was a lieutenant in the 1st Dragoon Guards.

He succeeded his father as a baronet in the Baronetage of Nova Scotia on 4 July 1799. Sir Philip died sine prole. Lady Anstruther-Paterson died in 1818, her claim to inherit the title of Baroness Polwarth still unresolved.

References 

1752 births
1808 deaths
Baronets in the Baronetage of Nova Scotia
Members of the Parliament of Great Britain for Scottish constituencies
British MPs 1774–1780
Philip Paterson